Flex is a 2021 Philippine television variety show broadcast by GTV. Hosted by Mavy Legaspi, Lexi Gonzales, Althea Ablan and Joaquin Domagoso, it premiered on July 4, 2021 on the network's Sunday evening line up. The show concluded on August 21, 2021.

Cast
 Mavy Legaspi
 Lexi Gonzales
 Joaquin Domagoso
 Althea Ablan

References

External links
 

2021 Philippine television series debuts
2021 Philippine television series endings
Filipino-language television shows
GTV (Philippine TV network) original programming
Philippine variety television shows